Archibald Ritchie (12 April 1868 – 18 January 1932) was a Scottish footballer who played as a defender for East Stirlingshire, Nottingham Forest, Bristol Rovers, Swindon Town and the Scotland national football team.

Nottingham Forest
Ritchie made his debut for Nottingham Forest on 5 September 1891 in a 4–1 victory away to Bootle and his last competitive game was on 20 April 1899 at Derby County which Forest lost 2–0. He was part of the team that won the FA Cup in 1898.

International career
Ritchie won one cap with the Scotland national team against Wales in the 1891 British Home Championship.

Honours
 Nottingham Forest
 Football Alliance 1892 
 FA Cup winner: 1898

See also 
 List of Scotland international footballers (1–4 caps)

Notes

References 

Scottish footballers
1868 births
Association football defenders
Scotland international footballers
East Stirlingshire F.C. players
Nottingham Forest F.C. players
Bristol Rovers F.C. players
Swindon Town F.C. players
1932 deaths
FA Cup Final players
Football Alliance players
English Football League players
Southern Football League players
Footballers from Falkirk (council area)